Deckers is an unincorporated community along the South Platte River in Douglas County, Colorado, United States.  Stephen Decker built a general store here in the 1890s. He later added a saloon and called the settlement "Daffodil." The presence of natural springs led him to establish Deckers Mineral Springs and Resort in the popular region for fly-fishing.  Deckers received national attention for the June 2002 forest fire, known as the Hayman Fire, which burned thousands of acres on the outskirts of the Denver metro area.  The U.S. Post Office at Sedalia (ZIP Code 80135) now serves Deckers postal addresses.

Geography
Deckers is located at  (39.255386,-105.227222).

Camp
National Ramah Commission announced in March 2006 that it planned to open a Camp Ramah in the Rockies.  A  camp site has been purchased in Deckers. 
The camp, known as Ramah in the Rockies has been running since the Summer of 2010.

See also
 Denver-Aurora Metropolitan Statistical Area
 Denver-Aurora-Boulder Combined Statistical Area
 Front Range Urban Corridor
 List of cities and towns in Colorado

References

Unincorporated communities in Douglas County, Colorado
Unincorporated communities in Colorado
Denver metropolitan area